{|

{{Infobox ship career
|Hide header=
|Ship flag=
| 2|Ship owner=*1969–1971: Cunard Steamship Company Ltd
1971-1998. Trafalgar House
1998–2008: Carnival Corporation & plc
Since 2008: Istithmar World, Dubai
|Ship operator= *1969–2008: Cunard Line
2018–2022: PCFC Hotels
2022: Accor
|Ship registry=*1969–2008:  Southampton, United Kingdom
2008–2018:  Port Vila, Vanuatu
Since 2018:  Dubai, UAE
|Ship route=North Atlantic and cruising during Cunard service
|Ship ordered=1964
|Ship builder=John Brown and Company (Upper Clyde Shipbuilders), Clydebank, Scotland
|Ship original cost = £29,091,000
|Ship yard number=736
|Ship hull id=
|Ship laid down=5 July 1965
|Ship launched=20 September 1967 by Queen Elizabeth II
|Ship completed=26 November 1968 (Sea trials commenced)
|Ship acquired=
|Ship maiden voyage=2 May 1969
|Ship in service= 1969–2008
|Ship out of service=27 November 2008
|Ship status=  Floating hotel and museum at Mina Rashid, Dubai
|Ship identification=*
1968–2009: Callsign: GBTT, British ON 336703
2009–present: Callsign: YJVW6, 
}}

|}Queen Elizabeth 2 (QE2) is a retired British ocean liner converted into a floating hotel. Originally built for the Cunard Line, the ship, named as the second ship named Queen Elizabeth, was operated by Cunard as both a transatlantic liner and a cruise ship from 1969 to 2008. She was then laid up until converted and since 18 April 2018 has been operating as a floating hotel in Dubai.Queen Elizabeth 2 was designed for the transatlantic service from her home port of Southampton, UK, to New York, United States and was named after the earlier Cunard liner . Queen Elizabeth 2 was designed in Cunard's offices in Liverpool and Southampton and built in Clydebank, Scotland. She was considered the last of the transatlantic ocean liners until "Project Genesis" was announced by Cunard Line in 1995 after the business purchase of Cunard by Mickey Arison; chairman of Carnival and Carnival UK. Project Genesis was intended to create new life in the ocean liner saga, and in 1998, Cunard revealed the name: Queen Mary 2.Queen Elizabeth 2 was refitted with a modern diesel powerplant in 1986–87. She undertook regular world cruises during almost 40 years of service, and later operated predominantly as a cruise ship, sailing out of Southampton, England. Queen Elizabeth 2 had no running mate and never ran a year-round weekly transatlantic express service to New York. She did, however, continue the Cunard tradition of regular scheduled transatlantic crossings every year of her service life.Queen Elizabeth 2 retired from active Cunard service on 27 November 2008. She had been acquired by the private equity arm of Dubai World, which planned to begin conversion of the vessel to a 500-room floating hotel moored at the Palm Jumeirah, Dubai. The 2008 financial crisis intervened, however, and the ship was laid up at Dubai Drydocks and later Mina Rashid. Subsequent conversion plans were announced in 2012 and then again by the Oceanic Group in 2013, but both plans stalled. In November 2015, Cruise Arabia & Africa quoted DP World chairman Ahmed Sultan Bin Sulayem as saying that QE2 would not be scrapped and a Dubai-based construction company announced in March 2017 that it had been contracted to refurbish the ship. The restored QE2 opened to visitors on 18 April 2018, with a soft opening.

Development

By 1957, transatlantic travel was becoming dominated by air travel due to its speed and low cost relative to sea routes, with passenger numbers split 50:50 between sea and air transport. The increase in market share by air showed no signs of slowing down, especially once the Boeing 707 and the Douglas DC8 entered service in 1958. Conversely,  and Queen Elizabeth were becoming increasingly expensive to operate, and both internally and externally were relics of the pre-war years and needed to be retired by the mid-1960s.

Despite falling passenger revenues, Cunard did not want to give up its traditional role as a provider of a North Atlantic passenger service, and so decided to replace the existing ageing Queens with a new ocean liner designated "Q3", as it would be the third Cunard Queen.

The Q3 was projected to measure 75,000 gross register tons, have berths for 2,270 passengers, and cost about £30 million.

Work had proceeded as far as the preparation of submissions from six shipyards and applying for government financial assistance with the construction when misgivings among some executives and directors, coupled with a shareholder revolt, led to the benefits of the project being reappraised and ultimately cancelled on 19 October 1961.Cross.

Cunard decided to continue with a replacement "Queen" but with an altered operating regime and more flexible design. Realising the decline of transatlantic trade, it was visualised that she would be a three-class (First, Cabin and Tourist) dual-purpose ship operating for eight months of the year on the transatlantic route, and during the winter months would operate as a cruise ship in warmer climates.

Compared with the older Queens, which had two engine rooms and four propellers, the newly designated Q4 would be smaller with one boiler room, one engine room and two propellers, which combined with automation would allow a smaller engineering complement. This would require an engine output of 160,000 shp compared to the older Queens 200,000 shp, whilst the fuel consumption would be halved to 520 tons per 24 hours, this was expected to save £1 million a year in fuel bills. The Q4 would also be able to transit the Panama Canal and Suez Canal and the shallower draught of 32 feet, which was seven feet less than her predecessors, and which would allow her to enter ports that the old Queens could not.

Design

The interior and superstructure for the QE2 was designed by James Gardner. His design for the ocean liner was described by The Council of Industrial Design as that of a "very big yacht" and with a "look [that was] sleek, modern and purposeful".

Characteristics

Hull
The hull was of welded construction, which avoided the weight penalty of over ten million rivets and overlapped steel plates compared with the previous Queens, unlike the two previous ships the  QE2 also had a bulbous bow.

Superstructure

What was controversial at the time, was that Cunard decided not to paint the funnel with the line's distinctive colour and pattern, something that had been done on all merchant vessels since the first Cunard ship, sailed in 1840. Instead, the funnel was painted white and black, with the Cunard orange-red appearing only on the inside of the wind scoop. This practice ended in 1983 when QE2 returned from service in the Falklands War, and the funnel has been repainted in Cunard traditional colours (orange and black), with black horizontal bands (known as "hands") ever since.

The original pencil-like funnel was rebuilt in 1986 as an enlarged version using metal from the original, when the ship was converted from steam to diesel power.

Large quantities of aluminium were used in the framing and cladding of QE2s superstructure. This decision was designed to save weight, reducing the draft of the ship and lowering the fuel consumption, but it also posed the possibility of corrosion problems that can occur with joining the dissimilar metals together, so a jointing compound was coated between the steel and aluminium surfaces to prevent this happening. The low melting point of aluminium caused concern when QE2 was serving as a troopship during the Falklands War: some feared that if the ship were struck by a missile her upper decks would collapse quickly due to fire, thereby causing greater casualties.

In 1972, the first penthouse suites were added in an aluminium structure on Signal Deck and Sports Deck (now "Sun Deck"), behind the ship's bridge, and in 1977 this structure was expanded to include more suites with balconies, making QE2 one of the first ships to offer private terraces to passengers since Normandie in the 1930s.QE2s balcony accommodation was expanded for the final time during QE2s 1986/87 refurbishment in Bremerhaven. During this refit, the ship was given a new wider funnel built using panels from the original. It retained the traditional Cunard colours.QE2s final structural changes included the reworking of the aft decks during the 1994 refit (following the removal of the magrodome), and the addition of an undercover area on Sun Deck during her 2005 refit, creating a space known as Funnel Bar.

InteriorsQueen Elizabeth 2s interior configuration was laid out in a horizontal fashion, similar to France, where the spaces dedicated to the two classes were spread horizontally on specific decks, in contrast to the vertical class divisions of older liners. Where QE2 differed from France was that the first-class deck (Quarter Deck) was below the deck dedicated to tourist class (Upper Deck). Originally there were to be main lounges serving three classes, layered one atop the other, but when Cunard decided to make the ship a two-class vessel, only two main lounges were needed.

Instead of completely reconfiguring the Boat Deck, the ship's architects simply opened a well in the deck between what were to have been the second and third class lounges, creating a double-height space known as the Double Room (now the Grand Lounge). This too was unconventional in that it designated a grander two-storey space for tourist class passengers, while first-class passengers gathered in the standard height Queen's Room. The configuration for segregated Atlantic crossings gave first-class passengers the theatre balcony on Boat Deck, while tourist class used the orchestra level on Upper Deck.

Over the span of her thirty-nine-year seagoing career, QE2 received a number of interior refits and alterations.

The year she came into service, 1969, was also the year of the Apollo 11 mission, when the Concorde's prototype was unveiled, and the previous year Stanley Kubrick's film 2001: A Space Odyssey premiered. In keeping with those times, originally Cunard broke from the traditional interiors of their previous liners for QE2, especially the Art Deco style of the previous Queens. Instead modern materials like decorative laminates, aluminium and Perspex were used. The public rooms featured glass, stainless steel, dark carpeting and sea green leather. Furniture was modular and abstract art was used throughout public rooms and cabins.

Dennis Lennon was responsible for co-ordinating the interior design, and his team included Jon Bannenberg and Gaby Schreiber, although Lennon's original designs only remained intact for three years.

The Midships Lobby on Two Deck, where first-class passengers boarded for transatlantic journeys and all passengers boarded for cruises, was a circular room with a sunken seating area in the centre with green leather-clad banquettes and surrounded by a chrome railing. As a kingpin to this was a flared, white, trumpet-shaped, up lit column.

Another room, designed by Michael Inchbald, where QE2s advanced interior design was demonstrated was the first class lounge, the Queen's Room on Quarter Deck. This space, in colours of white and tan, featured a lowered ceiling with large indirectly lit slots, which, despite reducing the ceiling height, created an impression of airy openness above to deal with the otherwise oppressive dimensions of the single-storey room (c. 30m x 30m x 2.4m). In addition, the structural columns were flared at the top to blend into the ceiling and to lose the visual indication of low ceiling height that straight columns would have given. (The Midships Lobby copied these features but without achieving the airiness.) Inchbald repeated the flaring of the columns in the bases of his tables and leather shell chairs. The indirect lighting from above could be switched from a cool hue for summer to a warm hue for winter.

The Theatre Bar on Upper Deck featured red chairs, red drapes, a red egg crate fibreglass screen, and even a red baby grand piano. Some more traditional materials like wood veneer were used as highlights throughout the ship, especially in passenger corridors and staterooms. There was also an Observation Bar on Quarter Deck, a successor to its namesake, located in a similar location, on both previous Queens, which offered views through large windows over the ship's bow. This room was lost in QE2s 1972 refit, becoming galley space with the forward-facing windows plated over.

In the 1994 refit, almost all of the remaining original decor was replaced, with Cunard opting to reverse the original design direction of QE2s designers and use the line's traditional ocean liners as inspiration. The green velvet and leather Midships Bar became the Art Deco inspired Chart Room, receiving an original, custom-designed piano from Queen Mary. The (by now) blue dominated Theatre Bar was transformed into the Golden Lion Pub, which mimics a traditional Edwardian pub.

Some original elements were retained including the flared columns in the Queen's Room and Mid-Ships Lobby which were incorporated into the reworked designs. The Queen's Room's indirect lighting from above was replaced with uplighters which reversed the original light airy effect by illuminating the lowered ceiling and leaving shadows in the ceiling's slot. The furniture and carpet which replaced Michael Inchbald's designs were incongruous next to the flared columns and slotted ceiling.

By the time of her retirement, the synagogue was the only room that had remained unaltered since 1969. However it was reported that during QE2s 22 October five-night voyage, the synagogue was dismantled and removed from the ship before her final sailing to Dubai.

Artwork and artefacts

The designers included numerous pieces of artwork within the public rooms of the ship, as well as maritime artefacts drawn from Cunard's long history of operating merchant vessels.

Althea Wynne's sculpture of the White Horses of the Atlantic Ocean was installed in the Mauretania Restaurant. Two bronze busts were installed—one of Sir Samuel Cunard outside the Yacht Club, and one of Queen Elizabeth II in the Queen's Room. Four life-size statues of human forms—created by sculptor Janine Janet in marine materials like shell and coral, representing the four elements—were installed in the Princess Grill. A frieze designed by Brody Nevenshwander, depicting the words of T. S. Eliot, Sir Francis Drake, and John Masefield, was in the Chart Room. The Midships Lobby housed a solid silver model of Queen Elizabeth 2 made by Asprey of Bond Street in 1975, which was lost until a photograph found in 1997 led to the discovery of the model itself. It was placed on Queen Elizabeth 2 in 1999.

Three custom-designed tapestries were commissioned from Helena Hernmarck for the ship's launch, depicting the Queen as well as the launch of the ship. These tapestries were originally hung in the Quarter Deck "D" Stairway, outside the Columbia Restaurant. They were originally made with golden threads, but much of this was lost when they were incorrectly cleaned during the 1987 refit. They were subsequently hung in the "E" stairway and later damaged in 2005.

There are numerous photographs, oils, and pastels of members of the Royal Family throughout the vessel.

There were also a vast array of Cunard postcards, porcelain, flatware, boxes, linen, and Lines Bros Tri-ang Minic model ships. One of the key pieces was a replica of the figurehead from Cunard's first ship , carved from Quebec yellow pine by Cornish sculptor Charles Moore and presented to the ship by Lloyd's of London.

On the Upper Deck sits the silver Boston Commemorative Cup, presented to Britannia by the City of Boston in 1840. This cup was lost for decades until it was found in a pawn shop in Halifax, Nova Scotia. On "2" Deck was a bronze entitled Spirit of the Atlantic that was designed by Barney Seale for the second . A large wooden plaque was presented to Queen Elizabeth 2 by First Sea Lord Sir John Fieldhouse to commemorate the ship's service as a Hired Military Transport (HMT) in the Falklands War.

There was also an extensive collection of large-scale models of Cunard ships located throughout Queen Elizabeth 2.

Over the years the ship's collection was added to. Among those items was a set of antique Japanese armour presented to Queen Elizabeth 2 by the Governor of Kagoshima, Japan, during her 1979 world cruise, as was a Wedgwood vase presented to the ship by Lord Wedgwood.

Throughout the public areas were also silver plaques commemorating the visits of every member of the Royal Family, as well as other dignitaries such as South African president Nelson Mandela.

Istithmar bought most of these items from Cunard when it purchased QE2.

Crew accommodation
The majority of the crew were accommodated in two- or four-berth cabins, with showers and toilets at the end of each alleyway. These were located forward and aft on decks three to six. Officers were accommodated in single cabins with private in-suite bathrooms located on Sun Deck.

There were six crew bars, the main four were split into the Senior Rates Recreation Rooms on Deck 2 and the Junior Rates on Deck 3, with Deck and Engine Departments on the port side and Hotel on the starboard side of the ship. The Female crew recreation room was on Deck 1 next to their dedicated mess room. Over time the Deck & Engine Ratings Room became The Petty Officers Club and then the Fo'c'sle Club when the British Deck and Engine crew were changed to Filipino crew. The Hotel Senior Rates room became a crew gym. The Junior Rates Rooms on Deck 3 were the main crew bars and were called The Pig & Whistle. ("The 2 deck Pig" and three deck pig, for short and a tradition aboard Cunard ships) and Castaways on the starboard side. After the expansion of female crew following the conversion to diesel power, the female-only recreation and mess room became a crew library and later the crew services office. The final bar on Deck 6 aft was small and in a former crew launderette so it was called the Dhobi Arms, a hang out for the Liverpool crew but was closed in the late '80s. A bar, dedicated for the officers, is located at the forward end of Boat Deck. Named The Officers Wardroom, this area enjoyed forward-facing views and was often opened to passengers for cocktail parties hosted by the senior officers. The crew mess was situated at the forward end of One Deck, adjacent to the crew services office.

MachineryQueen Elizabeth 2 was originally fitted out with a steam turbine propulsion system utilising three Foster Wheeler E.S.D II boilers, which provided steam for the two Brown-Pametrada turbines.

The steam turbines were plagued with problems from the time the ship first entered service and, despite being technically advanced and fuel-efficient in 1968, her consumption of 600 tons of fuel oil every twenty-four hours was more than expected for such a ship by the 1980s. After seventeen years of service, the availability of spare parts was becoming difficult due to the outdated design of the boilers and turbines and the constant use of the machinery which was mainly due to the deletion of the originally planned 4th boiler as a cost-saving measure while on the drawing board by Cunard.

The shipping company decided that the options were to either do nothing for the remainder of the ship's life, re-configure the existing engines, or completely re-engine the vessel with a modern, more efficient and more reliable diesel-electric powerplant. Ultimately it was decided to replace the engines, as it was calculated that the savings in fuel costs and maintenance would pay for themselves over four years whilst giving the vessel a minimum of another twenty years of service, whereas the other options would only provide short-term relief. Her steam turbines had taken her to a record-breaking total of 2,622,858 miles in 18 years.

During the ship's 1986 to 1987 refit, the steam turbines were removed and replaced with nine German MAN 9L58/64 nine-cylinder, medium-speed diesel engines, each weighing approximately 120 tons. Using a diesel-electric configuration, each engine drives a generator, each developing 10.5 MW of electrical power at 10,000 volts. This electrical plant, in addition to powering the ship's auxiliary and hotel services through transformers, drives the two main propulsion motors, one on each propeller shaft. These motors produce 44 MW each and are of synchronised salient-pole construction, nine metres in diameter and weighing more than 400 tons each.

The maximum power output with the new engine configuration running increased to 130,000 hp, which was greater than the previous system's 110,000 hp. Using the same IBF-380 (Bunker C) fuel, the new configuration yielded a 35% fuel saving over the previous system. During the re-engining process, her funnel was replaced by a wider one to accommodate the exhaust pipes for the nine MAN diesel engines.

During the refit, the original fixed-pitch propellers were replaced with variable-pitch propellers. The old steam propulsion system required astern turbines to move the ship backwards or stop her moving forward. The pitch of the new variable pitch blades could simply be reversed, causing a reversal of propeller thrust while maintaining the same direction of propeller rotation, allowing the ship shorter stopping times and improved handling characteristics.

The new propellers were originally fitted with "Grim Wheels", named after their inventor, Dr. Ing Otto Grim. These were free-spinning propeller blades fitted behind the main propellers, with long vanes protruding from the centre hub. The Grim Wheels were designed to recover lost propeller thrust and reduce fuel consumption by 2.5 to 3%. After the trial of these wheels, when the ship was drydocked, the majority of the vanes on each wheel were discovered to have broken off. The wheels were removed and the project was abandoned.

Other machinery includes nine heat recovery boilers, coupled with two oil-fired boilers to produce steam for heating fuel, domestic water, swimming pools, laundry equipment, and galleys. Four flash evaporators and a reverse-osmosis unit desalinate seawater to produce 1000 tons of freshwater daily. There is also a sanitation system and sewage disposal plant, air conditioning plant, and an electro-hydraulic steering system.

Construction
On 30 December 1964, Cunard placed an order for construction of the new ship with John Brown and Company, who would build it at their shipyard in Clydebank, Scotland. The agreed price was £25,427,000 with provision for escalation of labour and materials increases, with an agreed delivery date of May 1968. To assist with its construction the British government provided financial assistance to Cunard in the form of a £17.6 million loan at 4.5% interest.

The ship was launched and named on 20 September 1967 by Queen Elizabeth II, using the same pair of gold scissors her mother and grandmother used to launch Queen Elizabeth and Queen Mary, respectively. After the bottle of champagne was smashed the QE2 stayed put on the slipway for 90 seconds before being let free.

Name
Authorities disagree over whether the ship's namesake is the monarch Elizabeth II or the liner Queen Elizabeth.

Form of name

The name of the liner as it appears on the bow and stern is Queen Elizabeth 2, with upper- and lower-case lettering and an Arabic numeral 2 as opposed to the Roman numeral II, distinguishing her from the monarch, Elizabeth II; it is commonly pronounced in speech as Queen Elizabeth Two. Soon after launching, the name was shortened in common use as QE2.

BackgroundQueen Mary, in 1934, and Queen Elizabeth, in 1938, were both named by and for contemporary spouses of reigning monarchs: Mary of Teck and Elizabeth Bowes-Lyon, respectively. These two previous Cunarders both had capitalised bow names, as QUEEN MARY and QUEEN ELIZABETH.

Cunard practice at the time of naming QE2 was to re-use the existing name of its former ships, for example, launching  in 1938 after the previous  was scrapped in 1935.

The original Queen Elizabeth was still in service with Cunard when QE2 was launched in 1967, although she was retired and sold before QE2 entered revenue service with Cunard in 1969.

The addition of a "2" in this manner was unknown at the time, but it was not unknown for Roman numerals to denote ships in service with the same name. Two non-Cunard ships were named Queen Mary II: a Clyde steamer, and Mauretania II, a Southampton steamer of Red Funnel, since the Cunard ships already had the names without Roman numerals.

Launch
As was Cunard practice at the time, the name of the liner was not to be publicly revealed until the launch. Dignitaries were invited to the "Launch of Cunard Liner No. 736", as no name had yet been painted on the bow.

The Queen launched the ship with the words "I name this ship Queen Elizabeth the Second," the normal short form of address of the monarch, Elizabeth II herself.
The following day, the New York Times and The Times of London printed the name as Queen Elizabeth II, the short form of written style of the monarch. However, when the liner left the shipyard in 1968 she bore the name Queen Elizabeth 2 on her bow, and has continued to do so ever since.

1969 authorised history
In an authorised history of Queen Elizabeth 2 published in 1969, various explanations of events occur.

These state that, as at the launch ceremony, an envelope and card were also held in New York in case of transmission failure, and when opened the card was found to read the name Queen Elizabeth, and that the decision to add "The Second" to the name was an alteration by the Queen. The book quotes the Cunard chairman Sir Basil Smallpeice as saying "The Queen Mary [named] after her Grandmother, the Queen Elizabeth after her mother, and now this magnificent ship after herself."

Following the unexpected addition of the Second by the Queen, the book attributes the use of upper and lower case lettering and a numeric 2 – rather than a Roman II – to the decision by Cunard to use a more modern typeface to suit the style of the 1960s. The book also surmises that the naming of the liner after the reigning monarch, in the form Queen Elizabeth II, was potentially offensive to some Scots, as the title of Queen Elizabeth II (of the United Kingdom) relates to the lineage of the throne of England and Ireland (the Tudor monarch Elizabeth I having reigned only in England and Ireland).

Ron Warwick, former captain
In a later account by Ronald Warwick, who was the son of William "Bil" Warwick and the first master of QE2, Warwick junior (himself later in his Cunard career a master of the QE2 and latterly the first captain of QM2) supports the account that the Queen initiated the surprise move of naming the liner after herself rather than simply Queen Elizabeth as had originally been planned (the name having been made vacant by the retirement of the current liner before the new one was commissioned). The name had been given to the Queen in a sealed envelope which she didn't open. The book, referencing his autobiography, states that the Cunard chairman Sir Basil  was delighted with this development, it being in keeping with the previous Queen liners, and the 2 was added by Cunard for differentiation of the ship while still denoting it was named after the Queen.

Cunard website
From at least 2002 the official Cunard website stated that "The new ship is not named after the Queen but is simply the second ship to bear the name – hence the use of the Arabic 2 in her name, rather than the Roman II used by the Queen", however, in late 2008 this information had been removed due to the ship's retirement.

Other accounts
Other later accounts repeat the position that Cunard originally intended to name the ship Queen Elizabeth and the addition of a 2 by the Queen was a surprise to Cunard, in 1990 and 2008, although two books by William H. Miller state that Queen Elizabeth 2 was the name agreed on before the launch between Cunard officials and the Queen.

Accounts that repeat the position that QE2 was not named after the reigning monarch have been published in 1991, 1999, 2004, 2005, and 2008. In 2008, The Telegraph goes further to state the ship is named not only as the second ship named Queen Elizabeth, but is specifically named after the wife of King George VI. In contradiction however, some modern accounts continue to publish that the QE2 was named after the reigning monarch, in 2001 and 2008. There is a gilded bust that stands in the ship's queen's room depicting Queen Elizabeth II, not her mother.

Delivery
As construction continued on the new ship, Cunard found itself in increasing financial difficulties as increased competition from airlines resulted in the company's passenger ships losing money. With profits from its cargo ships eventually unable to offset the losses, Cunard was forced to sell Mauretania, Sylvania, Carinthia, Caronia, Queen Mary and Queen Elizabeth between 1965 and 1968. Income also fell due to a seven-week-long seamens' strike in 1966. Then John Brown advised that the delivery would be delayed by six months, which meant the ship would miss the 1968 peak summer transatlantic season. Following market research, Cunard decided to take advantage of the delay to change the original three-class configuration of the ship to a more flexible two-class arrangement of First and Tourist.

On 20 September 1967 with the launch date approaching, Cunard (having lost £7.5 million the previous year) approached the government with a request for an additional £3 million loan to complete the ship. Eventually the government agreed to increase the original £17.6 million loan up to £24 million.

On 19 November 1968, she left John Brown's fitting-out berth. Several industrial disputes with the Clydebank workers, with their resultant delays and quality issues, forced Cunard to transfer the ship to Southampton, where Vosper Thorneycroft completed the installation and commissioning work, prior to the sea trials.

Sea trials began on 26 November 1968 in the Irish Sea, proceeding to speed trials off the Isle of Arran.

Cunard initially refused to accept the ship, as the sea trials identified that the ship suffered from a resonant vibration which was traced to a design flaw in the blades of the steam turbines. This delayed her being handed over to her new owners until 18 April 1969. She then departed on a "shakedown cruise" to Las Palmas on 22 April 1969.

Service

Early careerQueen Elizabeth 2s maiden voyage, from Southampton to New York, commenced on 2 May 1969, taking 4 days, 16 hours, and 35 minutes.

In 1971, she participated in the rescue of some 500 passengers from the burning French Line ship .
Later that year on 5 March QE2 was disabled for four hours when jellyfish were sucked into and blocked her seawater intakes.

On 17 May 1972, while travelling from New York to Southampton, she was the subject of a bomb threat. She was searched by her crew, and a combined Special Air Service and Special Boat Service team which parachuted into the sea to conduct a search of the ship. No bomb was found, but the hoaxer was arrested by the FBI.

The following year QE2 undertook two chartered cruises through the Mediterranean to Israel in commemoration of the 25th anniversary of the state's founding. The ship's Columbia Restaurant was koshered for Passover, and Jewish passengers were able to celebrate Passover on the ship. According to the book "The Angel" by Uri Bar-Joseph, Muammar Gaddafi ordered a submarine to torpedo her during one of the chartered cruises in retaliation for Israel's downing of Libyan Flight 114, but Anwar Sadat intervened secretly to foil the attack.

She continued the Cunard tradition of regular scheduled transatlantic crossings every year of her service life, crossing on an opposite and symbiotic summer schedule with the CGT's famous  between 1961 and 1974.

On 23 July 1976 while the ship was 80 miles off the Scilly Isles on a transatlantic voyage, a flexible coupling drive connecting the starboard main engine high-pressure rotor and the reduction gearbox ruptured. This allowed lubricating oil under pressure to enter into the main engine room where it ignited, creating a severe fire. It took 20 minutes to bring the fire under control. Reduced to two boilers, QE2 limped back to Southampton. Damage from the fire resulted in a replacement boiler having to be fitted by dry-docking the ship and cutting an access hole in her side.

By 1978 she was breaking even with an occupancy of 65%, generating revenues of greater than £30 million per year against which had to be deducted an annual fuel cost of £5 million and a monthly crew cost of £225,000. With it costing £80,000 a day for her to sit idle in port, her owners made every attempt to keep her at sea and full of passengers. As a result, as much maintenance as possible was undertaken while at sea. However, she needed all three of her boilers to be in service if she was to maintain her transatlantic schedule. With limited ability to maintain her boilers, reliability was becoming a serious issue.

Between the late 1970s and early 1980s, the ship was testing a new ablative anti-fouling type paint for the Admiralty which was only available in blue. When they finally made the paint available in different colours they returned QE2 anti-fouling paint to the traditional red colour.

Falklands War

On 3 May 1982, she was requisitioned by the British government for service as a troop carrier in the Falklands War.

In preparation for war service, Vosper Thornycroft commenced in Southampton on 5 May 1982 the installation of two helicopter pads, the transformation of public lounges into dormitories, the installation of fuel pipes that ran through the ship down to the engine room to allow for refuelling at sea, and the covering of carpets with 2,000 sheets of hardboard. A quarter of the ship's length was reinforced with steel plating, and an anti-magnetic coil was fitted to combat naval mines. Over 650 Cunard crew members volunteered for the voyage, to look after the 3,000 members of the Fifth Infantry Brigade, which the ship transported to South Georgia.

On 12 May 1982, with only one of her three boilers in operation, the ship departed Southampton for the South Atlantic, carrying 3,000 troops and 650 volunteer crew. The remaining boilers were brought back into service as she steamed south.

During the voyage, the ship was blacked out and the radar switched off to avoid detection, steaming on without modern aids.QE2 returned to the UK on 11 June 1982, where she was greeted in Southampton Water by The Queen Mother on board . Peter Jackson, the captain of the ocean liner, responded to the Queen Mother's welcome: "Please convey to Her Majesty Queen Elizabeth our thanks for her kind message. Cunard's Queen Elizabeth 2 is proud to have been of service to Her Majesty's Forces." The ship underwent conversion back to passenger service, with her funnel being painted in the traditional Cunard orange with black stripes, which are known as "hands," for the first time, during the refit the hull's exterior was repainted an unconventional light pebble grey. She returned to service on 7 August 1982.

The new colour scheme proved unpopular with passengers, as well as difficult to maintain and so the hull reverted to traditional colours in 1983. Later that year, QE2 was fitted with a magrodome over her quarter-deck pool.

Diesel era and Project LifestyleQE2 once again experienced mechanical problems following her annual overhaul in November 1983. Boiler problems caused Cunard to cancel a cruise, and, in October 1984, an electrical fire caused a complete loss of power. The ship was delayed for several days before power could be restored. Instead of replacing the QE2 with a newer vessel, Cunard decided that it was more prudent to simply make improvements to her. Therefore, from 27 October 1986 to 25 April 1987, QE2 underwent one of her most significant refurbishments when she was converted by Lloyd Werft at their shipyard in Bremerhaven, Germany from steam power to diesel. Nine MAN B&W diesel-electric engines, new propellers and a heat recovery system (to utilise heat expelled by the engines) were fitted, which halved the fuel consumption. With this new propulsion system, QE2 was expected to serve another 20 years with Cunard. The passenger accommodation was also modernised. The refurbishment cost over £100 million.

On 7 August 1992, the underside of the hull was extensively damaged when she ran aground south of Cuttyhunk Island near Martha's Vineyard, while returning from a five-day cruise to Halifax, Nova Scotia along the east coast of the United States and Canada. A combination of her speed, an uncharted shoal and underestimating the increase in the ship's draft due to the effect of squat led to the ship's hull scraping rocks on the ocean floor. The accident resulted in the passengers disembarking earlier than scheduled at nearby Newport, Rhode Island and the ship being taken out of service while temporary repairs were made in drydock at Boston. Several days later, divers found the red paint from the keel on previously uncharted rocks where the ship struck the bottom.Marine Accident Report—Grounding of the United Kingdom Passenger Vessel RMS QUEEN ELIZABETH 2 Near Cuttyhunk Island, Vineyard Sound, Massachusetts, August 7, 1992 (NTSB/MAR-93/01), pp. 21-26. National Transportation Safety Board: 25 May 1993.

By the mid-1990s, it was decided that QE2 was due for a new look and in 1994 the ship was given a multimillion-pound refurbishment in Hamburg code-named Project Lifestyle.

One year later, during her twentieth world cruise, she completed her four millionth mile. The ship had sailed the equivalent of 185 times around the planet.QE2 celebrated the 30th anniversary of her maiden voyage in Southampton in 1999. In three decades she had 1,159 voyages, sailed  and carried over two million passengers.

Later years

Following the 1998 acquisition of the Cunard Line by Carnival Corporation, in 1999 QE2 was given a US$30 million refurbishment which included refreshing various public rooms, and a new colour palette in the passenger cabins. The Royal Promenade, which formerly housed upscale shops such as Burberry, H. Stern and Aquascutum, were replaced by boutiques typical of cruise ships, selling perfumes, watches and logo items. During this refit, the hull was stripped to bare metal, and the ship repainted in the traditional Cunard colours of matte black (Federal Grey) with a white superstructure.

On 29 August 2002, Queen Elizabeth 2 became the first merchant ship to sail more than 5 million nautical miles at sea.

In 2004, the vessel stopped plying the traditional transatlantic route and began full-time cruising, the transatlantic route having been assigned to Cunard's new flagship, . However, Queen Elizabeth 2 still undertook an annual world cruise and regular trips around the Mediterranean. By this time, she lacked the amenities to rival newer, larger cruise ships, but she still had unique features such as her ballrooms, hospital, and 6,000-book library. QE2 remained the fastest cruise ship afloat (28.5 knots), with fuel economy at this speed at 49.5 ft to the gallon (4 m/L). While cruising at slower speeds efficiency was improved to 125 ft per gallon (10 m/L).

At the end of her 2005 world cruise, some pieces of her artwork were damaged when some crew members who had become inebriated at an on-board crew party, went on a vandalism rampage through the public areas of the ship. A unique tapestry of Queen Elizabeth 2, commissioned for the launch of the ship, was thrown overboard by a drunken crewman. An oil painting of Queen Elizabeth II and two other tapestries were also damaged, along with a part of the entertainment area and a lifeboat. The crew members involved were dismissed from service.

On 5 November 2004, Queen Elizabeth 2 became Cunard's longest serving express liner, surpassing s 35 years, while on 4 September 2005, during a call to the port of Sydney, Nova Scotia, QE2 became the longest serving Cunarder, surpassing s record.

On 20 February 2007 Queen Elizabeth 2, while on her annual world cruise, met her running mate and successor flagship QM2 (herself on her maiden world cruise) in Sydney Harbour, Australia. This was the first time two Cunard Queens had been together in Sydney since the original Queen Mary and Queen Elizabeth served as troop ships in 1941.

 Retirement Announcement 
On 18 June 2007, it was announced by Cunard that QE2 had been purchased by the Dubai investment company Istithmar for $100 million. Her retirement, in part, was forced by the oncoming June 2010 implementation of the International Convention for the Safety of Life at Sea (SOLAS) regulations, which would have forced large and expensive structural changes to the ship.

Retirement and final Cunard voyage

In a ceremonial display before her retirement, Queen Elizabeth 2 met  and Queen Mary 2 near the Statue of Liberty in New York Harbor on 13 January 2008, with a celebratory fireworks display; Queen Elizabeth 2 and Queen Victoria had made a tandem crossing of the Atlantic for the meet. This marked the first time three Cunard Queens had been present in the same location. (Cunard stated this would be the last time these three particular ships would meet, due to the impending retirement of Queen Elizabeth 2. However, due to a change in QE2s schedule, the three ships met again in Southampton on 22 April 2008.)QE2 shared the harbour at Zeebrugge with Queen Victoria on 19 July 2008, where the two Cunarders exchanged whistle blasts.

On 3 October 2008, QE2 set off from Cork for Douglas Bay on her farewell tour of Ireland and Britain, before heading for Liverpool. She left Liverpool and arrived in Belfast on 4 October 2008, before moving to Greenock the next day (the ship's height with funnel makes it impossible to pass under the Erskine Bridge so Clydebank is not reachable). The farewell was viewed by large crowds and concluded with a firework display. QE2 then sailed around Scotland to the Firth of Forth on 7 October 2008, where she anchored in the shadow of the Forth Bridge. The next day, following an RAF flypast, she left amidst a flotilla of small craft to head to Newcastle upon Tyne, before returning to Southampton.

 Final Westbound & Eastbound Transatlantic Crossings QE2 completed her final Atlantic crossings in tandem with her successor, QM2. The ships departed for the final westbound crossing from Southampton on 10 October, sailing tandem and arriving in New York City one final time on 16 October. The Queen Mary 2 docked at the Brooklyn cruise terminal, while the QE2 docked in Manhattan. The two liners departed New York on 16 October for the final eastbound crossing, arriving in Southampton on 22 October. This marked the end of QE2s transatlantic voyages.

 Final Voyage 
On her final arrival into Southampton, QE2 (on 11 November 2008, with 1,700 passengers and 1,000 crew on board) ran aground in the Solent near the Southampton Water entrance at 5.26 am, on a triangular sandbank roughly equidistant between the mouth of Southampton Water and East Cowes named Bramble Bank. BBC reported "Cunard has confirmed it touched the bottom at the Brambles Turn sandbank (sandback) near Calshot, Southampton Water, with three tugs attached to her stern (0530 GMT). A fourth tug secured a line to the ship's bow." Solent Coastguard stated: "Five tugs were sent out to assist her getting off the sandbank, and she was pulled off just before 6.10 am. She had been refloated and was under way under her own power and heading back to her berth in Southampton. She had only partially gone aground, and the tugs pulled her off."

Once safely back at her berth, preparations continued for her farewell celebrations. These were led by Prince Philip, Duke of Edinburgh who toured the ship at great length. He visited areas of interest including the Engine Control Room. He also met with current and former crew members. During this time, divers were sent down to inspect the hull for any possible damage caused by the vessel's earlier mishap – none was found.Queen Elizabeth 2 left Southampton Docks for the final time at 1915 GMT on 11 November 2008, to begin her farewell voyage by the name of "QE2s Final Voyage". After purchasing her for US$100 million her ownership passed to Nakheel Properties, a company of Dubai World, on 26 November. The decommissioning of the ship was particularly poignant for Queen Elizabeth 2s only permanent resident, Beatrice Muller, aged 89, who lived on board in retirement for fourteen years, at a cost of some £3,500 (~€4,300, ~$5,400) per month.

At the time of her retirement, QE2 had sailed 5.6 million miles, carried 2.5 million passengers and completed 806 transatlantic crossings.

Layup
Istithmar, Nakheel, QE2 in Dubai and Cape Town hotel proposal

Her final voyage from Southampton to Dubai under the command of Captain Ian McNaught began on 11 November 2008, arriving on 26 November in a flotilla of 60 smaller vessels, led by MY Dubai, the personal yacht of Sheikh Mohammed, ruler of Dubai, in time for her official handover the following day.

She was greeted with a fly-past from an Emirates Airbus A380 jet and a huge fireworks display, while thousands of people gathered at the Mina Rashid, waving the flags of the United Kingdom and the United Arab Emirates. Since her arrival in Dubai QE2 remained moored at Port Rashid. Shortly after her final passengers were disembarked, she was moved forward to the cargo area of the port, to free up the passenger terminal for other cruise vessels.

She was expected to be refurbished and berthed permanently at Nakheel's Palm Jumeirah as "a luxury floating hotel, retail, museum and entertainment destination."

It was anticipated that QE2 would be moved to the Dubai Drydocks sometime in 2009 to begin a series of far-reaching refurbishments which would result in a conversion into a floating hotel.

Due to the 2008 global recession, it was rumoured that QE2s refurbishment and hotel conversion would not take place and that the ship would be resold. These rumours resulted in the owners, Istithmar, issuing a series of press releases stating that plans for QE2's conversion were ongoing, with no intention to sell. However, since arriving in Dubai the only visible exterior change to QE2 was the painting out of the Cunard titles from the ship's superstructure.QE2 was joined in Mina Rashid by QM2 on 21 March 2009 while QM2 visited Dubai as part of her 2009 World Cruise. QM2 and QV again visited QE2 in 2010 and on 31 March 2011 the new  (QE) called at Dubai during her maiden world cruise – photos were arranged by Cunard to capture the occasion. QM2 called in Dubai two days after QE left.

In April 2009, an alleged concept model of the post refurbished Hotel QE2 was shown for sale on an online auction website. The model depicts a much altered QE2.

In June 2009, the Southampton Daily Echo reported that Queen Elizabeth 2 would return to the UK as an operating cruise ship. However, on 20 July 2009 the owners Nakheel confirmed rumours that QE2 would re position to Cape Town for use as a floating hotel. On 24 June 2009, QE2 made her first journey after nearly eight months of inactivity since the liner arrived in Dubai. She manoeuvred under her own power into the Dubai Drydocks for inspection and hull repainting before the then planned voyage to Cape Town's V&A Waterfront to serve there as a floating hotel for the FIFA World Cup 2010 and beyond.

On 10 July 2009, it was revealed that QE2 might sail to Cape Town, South Africa, to become a floating hotel for use primarily during the 2010 FIFA World Cup, in a Dubai World sponsored venture at the V&A Waterfront. This was confirmed by Nakheel on 20 July 2009. In preparation for this expected voyage the ship was placed into the Dubai Drydock and underwent an extensive exterior refurbishment. During this refit, the ship's underwater hull was repainted and inspected. Shortly after the refit, QE2 was registered under the flag of Vanuatu, and Port Vila was painted on her stern, replacing Southampton.QE2 returned to Port Rashid, where it was anticipated she would soon sail for Cape Town. The arrival of QE2 in Cape Town was expected to create many local jobs including hotel staff, restaurant staff, chefs, cleaners and shop attendants, all being sourced from the local workforce. But, in January 2010, it was confirmed that QE2 would not be moved to Cape Town.

2010 sale and relocation speculation

In early 2010, due to the continued poor financial performance of Dubai World, there was much media speculation that QE2, along with other assets owned by Istithmar, Dubai World's private-equity arm, would be sold to raise capital. Despite this sale speculation, a number of alternative locations for QE2 have been cited including London, Singapore, Clydebank, Japan and Fremantle, the latter showing interest in using QE2 as a hotel for the ISAF Sailing World Championships to be held in December 2011. However, as at June 2010 Nakheel's official statement regarding QE2 was that "a number of options being considered for QE2".

2011 drifting
On 28 January 2011 during a heavy dust storm, QE2 broke loose from her moorings and drifted out into the channel at Port Rashid. She was attended by pilots and tugs and safely returned to berth at Port Rashid. Images of QE2's unexpected movements appeared on-line after being taken by an observer on the ship in front of QE2.

Warm layup
Throughout 2011 and 2012, QE2 remained berthed at Port Mina Rashid in Dubai . She was maintained in a seaworthy condition and generated her own power. Each of her nine diesel generators were turned over and used to power the ship. A live-in crew of approximately 50 people maintained QE2 to a high standard. Activities include painting, maintenance, cabin checks, and overhauls of machinery. Istithmar were considering plans for QE2 which could have involved the ship sailing to an alternative location under her own power.

On 21 March 2011, QM2 called in Dubai and docked close to QE2. During the departure, the two ships sounded their horns.

2011 move to Liverpool plan, Port Rashid and QE2 development plans

On 28 September 2011 news circulated that a plan was being formulated to return QE2 to the United Kingdom by berthing her in Liverpool. Liverpool has a historic connection with Cunard Line being the first British home for the line as well as housing the iconic Cunard Building.

It was revealed that Liverpool Vision, the economic development company responsible for Liverpool's regeneration, has been involved in confidential discussions with Out of Time Concepts, a company headed by a former Chief Engineer on the ship, who recently advised its current owners on plans to turn it into a luxury hotel in Dubai.

In a letter from Out of Time Concepts to Liverpool Vision, it was explained that "The free global media attention derived from bringing home Queen Elizabeth 2 will without question promote Liverpool's new waterfront developments, its amazing architecture, its maritime and world heritage sites, its museums, its culture and its history".

On the same week that the Liverpool Vision plans were revealed, Nakheel stated that plans for QE2 to be berthed at The Palm had been dropped because they now planned to build 102 houses on the site which was once intended to be named the QE2 Precinct.

Nakheel suggested that Queen Elizabeth 2, under the ownership of Istithmar, would remain at Port Rashid to become an integral part of the growing cruise terminal. "The QE2 would be placed in a much better location", Ali Rashid Lootah, the chairman of Nakheel, told Dubai's The National newspaper "The Government of Dubai is developing an up-to-date modern cruise terminal which will mean a better environment", confirming the ship would remain in Dubai for the foreseeable future.

2011/2012 New Year's party aboard QE2
On 31 December 2011, Queen Elizabeth 2 was the location of a lavish New Year's Eve party in Dubai. The black tie event was run by Global Event Management and included over 1,000 guests.  Global Event Management were offering events aboard QE2 in Dubai for 2012 and 2013.

July 2012: Hotel announcement
On 2 July 2012 in a coordinated press release, the ship's owner, operator and Port Rashid operator, DP Ports, jointly announced QE2 would re-open as a 300-bed hotel after an 18-month refit. The release claims the ship was to be refitted to restore original features, including her 1994–2008 'Heritage Trail' of classic Cunard artefacts. The ship was to be berthed alongside a redeveloped Port Rashid cruise terminal which would double as a maritime museum.

Scrapping in China, QE2 London and QE2 Asia
On 23 December 2012, it was reported that QE2 had been sold for scrapping in China for £20 million, after a bid to return her to the UK was rejected. With monthly berthing and maintenance charges of £650,000, it was reported that a Chinese salvage crew arrived at the vessel on 21 December, to replace a crew of 40 which has been maintaining the vessel since it arrived at Port Rashid. However, Cunard dismissed the reports as "pure speculation". When the ship was sold in 2007, a clause in the contract which started from her retirement in 2009 stipulated a ten-year "no onward sale" clause, without payment of a full purchase price default penalty.

The "QE2 London" Plan had included a £20 million bid for QE2 and a further £40 million refurbishment that was supposed to create more than 2,000 jobs in London, with Queen Elizabeth 2 docked near the O2 Arena. It had reportedly obtained the support of the then London Mayor Boris Johnson.

On 17 January 2013, the Dubai Drydocks World announced that Queen Elizabeth 2 would be sent to an unknown location in Asia to serve as a floating luxury hotel, shopping mall, and museum. Despite this move, the QE2 London team stated on the same day that "We believe our investors can show Dubai that QE2 London is still the best proposal".

"Bring QE2 Home" proposals
Cunard's 175th anniversary celebrations on 25 May 2015 led to renewed interest in Queen Elizabeth 2. John Chillingworth secured the backing of London mayor Boris Johnson for a plan to anchor the ship opposite The O2 Arena at Greenwich. A move to London however would require the ship to pass through the Thames Barrier. In late 2015 there was disagreement between ship preservation advocates and harbour authorities on whether a dead ship of her size could safely manoeuvre through the barrier. John Houston suggested returning the ship to Greenock as a maritime attraction, hotel and events space.

Inverclyde Council leader Stephen McCabe has called on the UK and Scottish governments to campaign to buy the ship, saying that "Bringing the QE2 home is a Herculean task, one that requires national support in Scotland and perhaps across the UK, if it has any chance of happening." In January 2016 Aubrey Fawcett, the chair of the working group to regenerate the Clyde, admitted defeat in this effort as QE2's owners refused to respond to any requests regarding her condition or sale. "Consequently, we must conclude that it is highly unlikely that Scotland features in the future plans for the vessel."

Queen Elizabeth 2 movements in 2015

On 12 August 2015, the QE2 was observed to have been moved from her berth within Dubai Dry Docks, where she had been since January 2013, to a more open location within Port Rashid. On 17 November 2015, QE2 was again moved within Port Rashid, to the former cruise terminal. It was not known whether these recent moves are connected with any of the publicly known plans regarding the ship's fate.

2016 removal of lifeboats and davits
Between May and August 2016, observers noted that the ship's lifeboats were lowered and stored on a nearby car park. Following this, the lifeboat davits were removed in September, giving the ship an altered profile on her boat deck. Subsequently, the wooden decking was removed from the deck and replaced by synthetic block flooring.

50th anniversary celebration
September 2017 marked the 50th anniversary of QE2's launch. To mark the occasion, Cunard Line, the ship's former owners, arranged a commemorative voyage aboard MS Queen Elizabeth – a 17-night cruise, with special activities and theme days. Meanwhile, in Glasgow, the QE2 Story Forum hosted a 50th anniversary conference with Captain Nick Bates as a speaker. Several books were released for the anniversary, including Building the Queen Elizabeth 2 by Cunard historian Michael Gallagher, and QE2: A 50th Anniversary Celebration by Chris Frame and Rachelle Cross.

Hotel and tourist attractionQueen Elizabeth 2'' reopened as a floating hotel on 18 April 2018, following an extensive refurbishment. Over 2.7 million man-hours were committed to the work to upgrade and rebuild the ship to meet hotel standards. This included a full hull repaint and the replacing of Port Vila registry with Dubai on her stern. It is a 'soft opening', while remaining work continues.

On board is a new QE2 Heritage Exhibition, adjacent to the lobby, detailing the vessel's history. The ship was operated by PCFC Hotels, a division of the Ports, Customs and Free Zone Corporation, which is owned by the Dubai government. The ship was sold in May 2022 to Accor, a French hospitality group. Accor has announced plans to further renovate the vessel; following completion there will be 447 hotel rooms for public booking.

The theatre on board the QE2 has been branded "Theatre by QE2" and regularly has shows including comedians like Jack Whitehall, tribute acts and family shows. Details of upcoming shows can be found at the Theatre website.

See also

References

Sources

External links

Queen Elizabeth 2 official websites
Queen Elizabeth 2 official website

QE2 history websites

Sam Warwick's QE2 homepage - since 1996
BBC Hampshire – QE2 One Year On
Bomb threats, champagne and dead whales – 50 remarkable facts about the QE2 Daily Telegraph

1967 ships
Ships built on the River Clyde
Cruise ships
Maritime incidents in 1972
Falklands War in South Georgia
Falklands War naval ships of the United Kingdom
Ocean liners of the United Kingdom
Passenger ships of the United Kingdom
Rogue wave incidents
Ships of the Cunard Line
Steamships
Troop ships of the United Kingdom
Maritime incidents in 1992
Maritime incidents in 1995
Tourist attractions in Dubai
Accor